The North Channel Bridge crosses the north channel of the Mississippi River between Latsch Island (part of Winona, Minnesota) and Buffalo County, Wisconsin.

The bridge has a street setup, with one lane in either direction. It carries Minnesota State Highway 43 and WI 54 in either direction. Immediately to the southwest is the Main Channel Bridge.

Images

See also
List of bridges documented by the Historic American Engineering Record in Minnesota
List of crossings of the Upper Mississippi River

References

External links
, includes both Main Channel and North Channel bridges

Road bridges in Minnesota
Bridges over the Mississippi River
Bridges completed in 1997
Road bridges in Wisconsin
Concrete bridges in the United States
Girder bridges in the United States
Historic American Engineering Record in Minnesota
Interstate vehicle bridges in the United States